This is a list of museums in Friuli Venezia Giulia, Italy.

References 

Friuli Venezia Giulia